Eukaryotic translation termination factor 1 (eRF1), also known as TB3-1, is a protein that in humans is encoded by the ETF1 gene.

In eukaryotes and archaea, this is the sole class 1 release factor (eRF) which recognizes all three stop codons. The overall process of termination is similar in bacteria, but in the latter 2 separate codon-recognizing release factors exist, RF1 and RF2.

Function 

Termination of protein biosynthesis and release of the nascent polypeptide chain are signaled by the presence of an in-frame stop codon at the aminoacyl site of the ribosome. The process of translation termination is universal and is mediated by protein release factors (RFs) and GTP. A class 1 RF recognizes the stop codon and promotes the hydrolysis of the ester bond linking the polypeptide chain with the peptidyl site tRNA, a reaction catalyzed at the peptidyl transferase center of the ribosome. Class 2 RFs, which are not codon specific and do not recognize codons, stimulate class 1 RF activity and confer GTP dependency upon the process. In bacteria, both class 1 RFs, RF1 and RF2, recognize UAA; however, UAG and UGA are decoded specifically by RF1 and RF2, respectively. In eukaryotes, eRF1, or ETF1, the functional counterpart of RF1 and RF2, functions as an omnipotent RF, decoding all 3 stop codons.

References

Further reading

External links 
 

Proteins